Marie Kendall (born Mary Ann Florence Holyome; 27 July 1873 – 5 May 1964) was a British music hall comedian and actress who had a successful career spanning 50 years.

Biography 
Kendall was born Mary Ann Florence Holyome on 27 July 1873 in Bethnal Green, London. At five years of age, she appeared onstage as "Baby Chester", beginning her career in music halls. When she was 15, she took the roles of principal boy in Aladdin and Dandini in Cinderella. For several years she toured England, Wales and Germany as a male impersonator. She enjoyed significant success in 1893 when she turned to female roles and sang "I'm One of the Girls" over 16 weeks in Camden Town. After that, Kendall performed at major venues in London, securing parts in pantomimes as well as singing Cockney songs in the best music halls. Her income dramatically increased. During the 1920s Kendall toured Australia.

In 1931, she was an original star of the Vintage Variety Company. The following year she performed in the Royal Variety Performance. Performing regularly well into her 60s, and retired from the stage in 1939.

Personal life 

In 1895, she married singer-songwriter Stephen McCarthy, the son of music hall comedian John McCarthy. The couple had four children; Terence, Shaun, Moya, and Pat. As adults, Terry and Pat were a successful brother-sister dance act. Terry's daughter was the actress Kay Kendall.

Death 
Marie Kendall died on 5 May 1964 in Clapham, London. On 25 September 2011 a commemorative blue plaque was erected to Marie Kendall by the theatre charity The Music Hall Guild of Great Britain and America at her former residence in Clapham.

Legacy 
Kendall happened to be performing in Dublin on 16 June 1904, the fictional date of James Joyce's novel Ulysses, and a supposed poster depicting her as a "charming soubrette" becomes a minor motif in the book.

Filmography 
 Say It with Flowers (1934)

References

External links 

1873 births
1964 deaths
Actresses from London
English stage actresses
English women comedians
Music hall performers
People from Bethnal Green
Comedians from London